Brian William Sinclair (born 2 August 1958) is an English former footballer who played as a forward for Bury, Blackpool, Port Vale, Winsford United, Ashton United and Kidderminster Harriers.

Career
Sinclair was signed to Bury, before making two Second Division appearances for Blackpool in the 1977–78 season. He left Bloomfield Road and joined Port Vale, initially on trial, in August 1978. He impressed enough to be offered a contract and was a regular first team player from February to April 1979, scoring two goals in 18 Fourth Division appearances in the 1978–79 season. However, he was sacked by "Valiants" manager Dennis Butler in August 1979 after failing to report to Vale Park for the 1979–80 season. He had already joined Winsford United and later played for Ashton United and Kidderminster Harriers (Southern League).

Career statistics
Source:

References

1958 births
Living people
Footballers from Liverpool
English footballers
Association football forwards
Bury F.C. players
Blackpool F.C. players
Port Vale F.C. players
Winsford United F.C. players
Ashton United F.C. players
Kidderminster Harriers F.C. players
English Football League players
Southern Football League players